Live Now, Pay Later is a 1962 British black-and-white film starring Ian Hendry, June Ritchie and John Gregson. Hendry plays a smooth-talking, conniving door-to-door salesman.

Plot
Unsavoury door-to-door salesman Albert Argyle's (Ian Hendry) technique involves bedding his female customers in an attempt to seduce them to buy on credit. As well as being unfaithful to his pregnant girlfriend (June Ritchie), the unrepentant Albert is also cheating his boss (John Gregson) out of profits, and also trying his hand at a spot of blackmail.

Preservation status
The only known print was discovered and finally made available on DVD in June 2020. The film premiered on Talking Pictures TV on 9 October 2022.

Cast

 Ian Hendry as Albert Argyle
 June Ritchie as Treasure
 John Gregson as Callendar
 Liz Fraser as Joyce Corby
 Geoffrey Keen as Reggie Corby
 Jeanette Sterke as Grace
 Peter Butterworth as Fred
 Nyree Dawn Porter as Marjorie Mason
 Ronald Howard as Cedric Mason
 Harold Berens as Solly Cowell
 Thelma Ruby as Hetty
 Monte Landis as Arnold (as Monty Landis)
 Kevin Brennan as Jackson
 Malcolm Knight as Ratty
 Bridget Armstrong as Gloria
 Judith Furse as Mrs. Ackroyd (as Judith Furze)
 Joan Heal as Mrs. Pocock
 Michael Brennan as Bailiff
 Geoffrey Hibbert as Price
 William Kendall as Major Simpkins
 Georgina Cookson as Lucy
 Justine Lord as Coral Wentworth
 Andrew Cruickshank as Vicar
 John Wood as Curate
 Peter Bowles as Reginald Parker
 Diana King as Woman Looking Round Flat
 Robert Raglan

Production 
Filming locations included London, Elstree and Luton. A collection of location stills and corresponding contemporary photographs is hosted at reelstreets.com.

Critical reception 
In a contemporary review, Variety considered it to have "many amusing moments, but overall it is untidy and does not develop the personalities of some of the main characters sufficiently"; whereas more recently, the Radio Times gave the film four out of five stars, noting "...a remarkably cynical and revealing portrait of Britain shifting from postwar austerity into rampant consumerism and the Swinging Sixties."

References

External links

Live Now, Pay Later at the British Film Institute's Film and TV Database

1962 films
1960s black comedy films
British black-and-white films
British black comedy films
Films scored by Ron Grainer
1962 comedy films
1962 drama films
1960s English-language films
1960s British films